Yolane Nicole Kukla  (born 29 September 1995) is an Australian butterfly and freestyle swimmer.

Career
At the 2010 Telstra Australian Swimming Championships in Sydney at just 14, Kukla earned selection for the Commonwealth Games team for Delhi, where she won the gold medal in the 50-metre freestyle, and Australian team for the Pan Pacific Championships. She made her senior Australian team debut at the 2010 Pan Pacific Swimming Championships where she collected two relay silver medals and finished 4th in the 50- and 100-metre freestyle and the 100-metre butterfly, along with winning the B final in the 50-metre butterfly equaling the existing championship record. At the 2010 Commonwealth Games she was dropped from the relays, and finished 4th in the 50- and 100-metre butterfly, she won the gold medal in the 50-metre freestyle in a time of 24.86 seconds.

Kukla swam in the heats of the 4×100-metre freestyle relay at the 2012 London Olympics helping qualify the team for the final where the team won the gold medal. The team included Libby Trickett, Emily Seebohm, Alicia Coutts, Cate Campbell, Melanie Schlanger and Brittany Elmslie.

See also
 List of Olympic medalists in swimming (women)

References

External links
 

1995 births
Living people
Australian people of Polish descent
Sportswomen from Queensland
Commonwealth Games gold medallists for Australia
Swimmers at the 2010 Commonwealth Games
Australian female butterfly swimmers
Australian female freestyle swimmers
Swimmers at the 2012 Summer Olympics
Olympic gold medalists for Australia
Olympic swimmers of Australia
Medalists at the 2012 Summer Olympics
Swimmers from Brisbane
Olympic gold medalists in swimming
Commonwealth Games medallists in swimming
Recipients of the Medal of the Order of Australia
21st-century Australian women
Medallists at the 2010 Commonwealth Games